Salyut Machine-Building Production Association is a company based in Moscow, Russia. NPC Saljut have three plants and office with further plants outside Moscow city. It is a subsidiary of United Engine Corporation.

Salyut is a leading commercial and military aircraft engine production association. Aircraft engine repairs and diagnostic services are also provided. Under conversion programs, Salyut produces a variety of commercial machinery and small engines.

Salyut manufactured the AL-21F turbofan engine for the Su-24 Fencer and the AL-31F engine for the Su-27 Flanker.

History
The factory was established in 1912 as a subsidiary of the French engine manufacturer Gnome et Rhône. In 1941 the factory was evacuated to Samara, eventually becoming JSC Kuznetsov. Engine production at the Moscow site was restored by July 1942. Since the 1980s, the main activity of the company is the production of turboshaft engines for various purposes.

Subsidiaries
 Naro Fominsk Motor Plant
 Perm Motor Plant
 Ufa UMPO plants
 Omsk OMKB
 Tyumen Motor Plant
 MMP Chernyshev, TMKB Soyuz (Tushino)
 MKB Sojuz (Turaevo), LMZ ODK

Products

 RD-33 versions
 TV1 TV3 TV7 VK Klimov engines
 AL-31 31F40 31FM1 31FM2, 41F1 41F117, AL-21 for Su-24
 AI-222 versions main AI222-25 for Yak-130, AI-22 AI-25 AI-28 Lotarev DV-2 RD-35 and others
 Progress D-27 Propfan along Aerosila
 Progress D-436 D-436T 148
 GTD-16S and GTU-20S Gas Turbine
 ST-100 (AI-222-25), SM-100
 Gas Turbines (various)
 GTD-20/12DTs 20 MW
 GTU-89ST-20 20 MW along MKB Granit
 Marine GTUs
 AMNTK Sojuz
 R179V-300 AMNTK, R79V-300
 R-179TV1 medium heavy cargo aircraft D-18 engine class
 GTD30-300 30 MW naval R179V
 R-579-300 >110 >190 KN

Production History
 AL-31F Lyulka 1984 for Su-27
 AL-21F Lyulka 1972 on Su 17 20 22 and for Su-24
 R-15B-300 Tumansky for MiG-25 1962
 AL-7F1 Lyulka 1955
 1950 turbojet VK-1 VK1A Klimov
 1948 turbojet RD-45 and RD-45F
 1947 turbojet TR-1 Lyulka

References

External links

 Official website 

United Engine Corporation
Aircraft engine manufacturers of Russia
Aircraft engine manufacturers of the Soviet Union
Gas turbine manufacturers
Marine engine manufacturers
Companies based in Moscow
Companies nationalised by the Soviet Union
Ministry of the Aviation Industry (Soviet Union)
Engine manufacturers of Russia